Chimera Beast is an unreleased coin-operated arcade video game developed by C.P. Brain and planned to be released by Jaleco in 1993. It is a scrolling shooter with primarily horizontal movement.

Plot 

Chimera Beast takes place on a planet which is described as distant and Earth-like. The planet is overrun by monsters known as eaters, capable of eating other creatures and acquiring their abilities or characteristics. The player controls one of these eaters and progresses through the game by means of the food chain, consuming microscopic organisms in the first stage, fish in the second, and so on. When the player's creature gets big enough to take on humanity, the goal of the game is revealed. The planet's humans have developed space travel, which the player must thwart, so as not to give the eaters a means of escaping the planet. There are two possible endings: one in which the player is able to stop the eaters from escaping the planet, and one in which the eaters do escape and, we are told, eventually make their way to Earth.

Gameplay 

The chief innovation of Chimera Beast is its power-up system. Instead of collecting gun upgrades as in most games of this genre, the player's eater enhances itself by eating other creatures and assuming their abilities and defenses. Instead of simply having various types of projectile weaponry, the game attempts to make these new abilities as varied as possible. Consuming a crustacean might give the player's eater a hard protective shell, for example, while an insectoid creature might offer a venomous tail instead. The game even includes the ability to use cancer as a weapon.

Another difference from typical shooter mechanics is that the player's eater does not die after being hit. It has a life bar, which can be charged by consuming enemies. It is even possible to eat enough to charge the life bar past its starting position, creating a larger eater which is not only more powerful but can take more damage as well.

Enemies 
The enemies in Chimera Beast are mostly animals, some with equivalent Earth versions and some without. Some of the enemy creatures include jellyfish, a lamprey, clownfish, clams, flying squirrels, and moles. Once the player reaches the human stage, they face war vehicles such as tanks and jets.

Technical details 

Chimera Beast runs on dual 68000 processors. Sound is provided by Yamaha YM2151 and dual OKI MSM6295 chips. Like most games of its time, it uses a standard JAMMA connector. The game uses the Jaleco Mega System 1 Hardware.

External links 
 Information at Arcade-History
 Enemy sprite pictures and information

Cancelled arcade video games
Arcade-only video games
Scrolling shooters
Jaleco games
Video games developed in Japan
Video games with alternate endings
Fictional hybrid life forms
Video games about evolution
Video games about microbes
Video games set on fictional planets